Flavia Arcaro (June 22, 1876  – April 8, 1937) was an American silent film actress. She is known for her roles in The Naggers on Four Wheels- No Brakes (1932) and also in a play Dearest Enemy (1925).

Filmography 
Come to Dinner (Short) (1934) as Carlotta Prance
Fifi (Short) (1933) a part of the series Broadway Brevities
The Naggers on Four Wheels- No Brakes (1932)
Paying the Price (Short) (1916) as Vera Desmond 
The Secret Agent (Short) (1916) as Mrs. Vanderlind
The Ace of Death (Short) (1915) as Theresa
The Devil's Darling (Short) (1915)
Sunshine and Tempest (Short) (1915) as Nancy
The Unsuspected Isles (Short) (1915) as Lores
Capital Punishment (Short) (1915) as Vivian Baxley
The Cup of Chance (Short) (1915) as Hope's Mother
The Vivisectionist (Short) (1915) as The Actress
The Plunderer (1915) as Cook

References

External links
 

1876 births
1937 deaths
American silent film actresses
20th-century American actresses